Carlo Spiridione Mariotti (1726 in Perugia – 1790) was an Italian painter; he often painted genre scenes.

History
He was a pupil of Giacinto Boccanera and Antonio Maria Garbi in Perugia

References

1726 births
1790 deaths
18th-century Italian painters
Italian male painters
Umbrian painters
Italian genre painters
18th-century Italian male artists